John Vic Ortiz De Guzman (born September 23, 1993) is a Filipino athlete, volleyball player, actor, and singer.

Early life and education
De Guzman lived in Laguna in his early years and became involved in various extracurricular activities. In his first year of high school, he was part of a band. In the next year, he became a dancer and, in his third year of high school studies, he started to play badminton. He attended the De La Salle–College of Saint Benilde under a scholarship program. He graduated with a degree in Human Resource Management.

Volleyball career
De Guzman only took up volleyball at age 18 after his high school studies. His involvement with the sport enabled him to study at no cost at the De La Salle–College of Saint Benilde (CSB) as an athletic scholar. Playing for the men's volleyball team of CSB, he led his school to back-to-back Final Four appearances. In his final school year as a college student he led his team in winning the men's volleyball title of NCAA Season 92. He was also named as the MVP and first best opposite spiker in his final NCAA season.

De Guzman also played for the Philippines men's national volleyball team in 2015. He was included in the squad played at the 2017 and 2019 Southeast Asian Games. He was also part of the national team, when it competed as Rebisco PH at the 2021 Asian Men's Club Volleyball Championship.

In the club level, De Guzman has played for PLDT and the Philippine Air Force Aguilas. He played for the latter at the 2021 PNVF Champions League.

Acting career
As a child, De Guzman had aspired to become an actor.

He then starred in Seklusyon, the sole horror film entry at the 2016 Metro Manila Film Festival. He played the role of Marco, one of the four deacons in the film. Marco is characterized as someone who has many secrets and De Guzman was told to express emotions through his eyes as part of playing the role. He secured the role of Marco after director Erik Matti encouraged him to audition for the role. De Guzman also underwent an acting workshop having no prior acting experience.

In 2017, he was cast in radio series Ang Lahat Ng Ito'y Para Sa'Yo on FBS-14.

In 2018, he was cast as one of the 24 students in the suspense-thriller film Class of 2018 directed by Charliebebs Gohetia and under T-Rex Entertainment.

De Guzman signed a contract with GMA Network on September 2020, becoming a part of their talent agency GMA Artist Center (now Sparkle). Prior to that, he tried to audition on 2018 but he was rejected.

Personal life
De Guzman has a sister, who he viewed as an inspiration when he took up volleyball. He is also the maternal nephew of Lino Brocka.

Filmography

Film

Television

Discography

References

External links

https://www.gmanetwork.com/sparkle/artists/johnvicdeguzman

1993 births
Living people
Filipino men's volleyball players
Philippines international volleyball players
Opposite hitters
Sportspeople from Laguna (province)
Male actors from Laguna (province)
De La Salle–College of Saint Benilde alumni
Competitors at the 2017 Southeast Asian Games
Filipino male film actors
Competitors at the 2019 Southeast Asian Games
Southeast Asian Games medalists in volleyball
Southeast Asian Games silver medalists for the Philippines
Competitors at the 2021 Southeast Asian Games
GMA Network personalities